Maximilian of Antioch (died ) was a Christian martyr under the Roman emperor Julian. He died circa 353. His feast day is 21 August.

See also

 Antioch

References

4th-century Christian martyrs
Syrian Christian saints
Year of birth unknown